Eric Guthrie (born April 27, 1947 in Vancouver, British Columbia) is a Canadian-born quarterback who played in the World Football League and Canadian Football League. He played for the BC Lions from 1972–1973, the Detroit Wheels in 1974, the BC Lions from 1975–1976, the Montreal Alouettes in 1977, and the Saskatchewan Roughriders in 1977.

College football
Guthrie played college football in the United States in Idaho at Boise State College.

At the Camellia Bowl in Sacramento, California, the Broncos were down by 21 points to Chico State after three quarters. Guthrie engineered  in the fourth quarter to win by four, with two of the three touchdowns on his passes. He also threw for a two-point conversion and made three kicks: two extra points and a 

It was later revealed that Guthrie had signed a professional baseball contract with the Pittsburgh Pirates organization five years earlier in 1966. The NCAA had Boise State return the winner's trophy and $18,000, its share of the gate and other receipts.

Guthrie was selected in fourteenth round of the 1972 NFL Draft by the San Francisco 49ers.

External links

References

1947 births
American football quarterbacks
BC Lions players
Boise State Broncos football players
Canadian players of American football
Detroit Wheels players
Living people
Montreal Alouettes players
Players of Canadian football from British Columbia
Canadian football people from Vancouver
Saskatchewan Roughriders players
Canadian football quarterbacks
Salem Rebels players
Baseball people from British Columbia